All Yours may refer to:

All Yours (Crystal Kay album), a 2007 Japanese album by Crystal Kay
All Yours (Astro album), released in 2021
All Yours, 2016 TV film with Dan Payne and Nicollette Sheridan
All Yours, 2015 album by Widowspeak
"All Yours (Tua)", a 1959 single by Jo Stafford on The Columbia Singles Collection, Vol. 1
"All Yours", a song by Ben Haenow from the 2015 album Ben Haenow